Chicago X is the eighth studio album, and tenth album overall, by the American band Chicago. It was recorded at Caribou Ranch and it was released by Columbia Records on June 14, 1976. The album made it to number three on the Billboard 200, and was certified gold by the Recording Industry Association of America (RIAA) on June 21, 1976, a week after its release. It was the band's first album to be certified platinum, on September 14, 1976, and has since been certified multi-platinum. In honor of the group's platinum album achievement, Columbia Records awarded the group a 25-pound bar of pure platinum, made by Cartier. (Billboard magazine reported it as a 30-pound bar.)

Chicago X was nominated for a Grammy Award for Album of the Year, and it won a Grammy Award for Best Album Package.

The album produced Chicago's first number one single in the United States, "If You Leave Me Now".  The single went on to win two Grammy Awards: for Best Pop Vocal Performance by a Duo, Group or Chorus, the band's first Grammy Award; and for Best Arrangement Accompanying Vocalists, for arrangers James William Guercio and Jimmie Haskell. It was also nominated for the Grammy Award for Record of the Year. It would later go on to be featured in the 2013 video game Grand Theft Auto V on the Los Santos Rock Radio station.

Two other songs from the album released as singles—"Another Rainy Day in New York City", and "You Are On My Mind"—made it into the Billboard Hot 100. "Another Rainy Day in New York City" made it to number 32, and "You Are on My Mind" went to number 49.

Record World called "You Are on My Mind" "another Chicago X showstopper."

Background
After recording Chicago VIII in a state of exhaustion, Chicago did not return to the studio until the spring of 1976, feeling refreshed after a substantial break away. Chicago X was released on June 14, 1976, to a receptive audience, giving Chicago a number three album on the Billboard 200 in the United States, and their first album to chart in the UK in years, at number 21.

The album featured two top forty singles: Robert Lamm's composition, "Another Rainy Day In New York City", which peaked at number 32 after a brief run in August 1976; and Peter Cetera's composition, "If You Leave Me Now", which became the band's first number one single in October of that same year. Originally written at the same time as Chicago VII'''s "Wishing You Were Here", "If You Leave Me Now" was one of the last to be completed and, according to reports, was very nearly left off the final product. "We're a band where anyone can contribute anything, so when Peter wrote this song, we gave it our all, even though we thought it wasn't anything special. Shows how little we knew," said Robert Lamm. Guitarist Terry Kath didn't like the increased emphasis in ballads, singling out this song as an example. Band member Walter Parazaider has been quoted as saying he heard the song on the radio while cleaning his pool and initially thought "it sounded like McCartney," not realizing it was his own band's work. The song became the band's first number one hit in the US and UK, and some band members felt the song's success changed the public's perception of the band, leading to more demand from Columbia Records for ballads, although Robert Lamm has since acknowledged that the band had started moving away from their politically-oriented music into the mainstream years earlier, beginning with 1972's Chicago V. Lamm and Kath, in particular, were uncomfortable with this turn of events.

Band members who normally were not vocalists received vocal credits on this album. The album is notable for the lead vocal debut of trombonist James Pankow. Different band singers tried "You Are On My Mind," but Pankow felt they were not nailing it the way he heard it in his head as the song's composer, so producer Guercio said, "You sing it," and that effort landed on the final album. "You Are On My Mind" was the third single for the album, reaching number 49 on the Billboard Hot 100 in April 1977.  Cash Box said of it that "the same mellow vocal blend is here, along with a velvety texture on the horns, but the rhythm section has speeded into a quick samba, decorated with colorful percussion.."  Lee Loughnane contributed the lead vocal for his song "Together Again". (Both Pankow and Loughnane would contribute lead vocals again on the next album, Chicago XI.) The brief vocal section of "You Get It Up" was sung by the entire band in unison — thus the album's atypical crediting of Danny Seraphine, Walter Parazaider, and Laudir de Oliveira with "vocals".

In 2002, Chicago X was remastered and reissued by Rhino Records with an early rendition of Chicago XIVs "I'd Rather Be Rich" by Lamm, as well as Kath's "Your Love's An Attitude" — both cut in 1975 — as bonus tracks. This album was mixed and released in both stereo and quadraphonic.

For the summer 2007 tour, the band included "You Are on My Mind" with Pankow again on vocals — the first time this song had been performed live since 1976–1977.

 Packaging 
Designed by Art Director of Columbia/CBS Records, John Berg, the album art depicts a partially unwrapped chocolate bar with the Chicago logo on it, resembling a Hershey's chocolate bar as it was packaged at the time, and winning for Berg a Grammy Award for Best Album Package. The cover design is labeled "chocolate bar" on the band's official web site. The cover art was included in a 2012-2013 exhibit of Berg's album covers at Guild Hall of East Hampton, and is now in the permanent collection of The Museum of Modern Art in New York City.

Track listing

 Personnel Chicago Peter Cetera – bass, lead and backing vocals
 Terry Kath – acoustic guitar, guitars (except on "If You Leave Me Now"), lead and backing vocals
 Robert Lamm – keyboards, lead and backing vocals
 Lee Loughnane – trumpet, backing vocals, lead vocals on "Together Again"
 James Pankow – trombone, lead vocals on "You Are On My Mind," backing vocals on "You Get It Up"
 Walter Parazaider – woodwinds, backing vocals
 Danny Seraphine – drums, backing vocals on "You Get It Up"
 Laudir de Oliveira – percussion, backing vocals on "You Get It Up"Additional personnel'''
 David J. Wolinski – keyboards on "Hope For Love"
 James William Guercio – lead and rhythm acoustic guitars on "If You Leave Me Now", guitar on "Hope For Love"
 George Hyde, Gene Sherry – french horns on "If You Leave Me Now"
 Othello Molineaux – steel drums on "Another Rainy Day in New York City"
 Leroy Williams –  steel drums on "Another Rainy Day in New York City"
 Jimmie Haskell – string and brass orchestration on "If You Leave Me Now" and "Mama Mama", conductor on "Gently I'll Wake You"

Production
 Produced by James William Guercio
 Engineered by Wayne Tarnowski
 Assistant Engineer – Tom Likes
 Strings recorded by Armin Steiner at Sound Labs (Hollywood, CA).
 Mastered by Doug Sax at The Mastering Lab (Los Angeles, CA).
 Album Cover Concept – John Berg
 Logo Design – Nick Fasciano
 Candy Bar Photo – Columbia Records Photo Studio
 Inside Photography – Reid Miles

Charts

Weekly Charts

Year-end charts

Certifications

Notes

References

Chicago (band) albums
1976 albums
Albums produced by James William Guercio
Columbia Records albums
Albums arranged by Jimmie Haskell
Albums with cover art by Reid Miles